Darren Philip Taylor (born 15 February 1965) is an English former first-class cricketer.

Lawrence was born at Burnley in February 1965. He later studied at Christ Church College at the University of Oxford. While studying at Oxford, he played first-class cricket for Oxford University in 1985 and 1986, making eight appearances. Playing as a wicket-keeper, Taylor scored 44 runs in his eight matches, in addition to taking seven catches and making two stumpings.

References

External links

1965 births
Living people
Alumni of Christ Church, Oxford
Cricketers from Burnley
English cricketers
Oxford University cricketers